Osheroff is a  surname generated from given name 'Osher'. Notable people with the surname include:

Abraham Osheroff (1915–2008), American social activist, carpenter, war veteran, documentary filmmaker, and lecturer
Douglas Osheroff (born 1945), American physicist

Russian-Jewish surnames